Unthank Hall is a Grade II listed property now serving as commercial offices, situated on the southern bank of the River South Tyne east of Plenmeller, near Haltwhistle, Northumberland.

In the 16th century the manor was owned by the Ridley family and it is possible that the bishop and martyr Nicholas Ridley was born there.

The house, which was built in the 16th century, incorporating an ancient pele tower, was substantially remodelled and extended in 1815.

The Hall came into the ownership of the Dixon family and then by marriage to the Browns. Dixon Brown (1776–1852) changed his name in 1825 to Dixon Dixon, and his nephew Rev Dixon Dixon Brown rebuilt the Hall between 1862 and 1865.

The house was substantially remodelled in 1815 and again in 1865 in a neo-Tudor style, both times by Newcastle architect John Dobson. Much of the 1865 house has since between demolished by further alterations in 1900 and a significant reduction in size in 1965.

See also
Hadrian's Wall

References

External links
   Keys to the Past

Grade II listed buildings in Northumberland
Country houses in Northumberland
History of Northumberland